Guy Marie Alexandre Thomazeau (born 5 December 1937) was the Archbishop of Montpellier from 2002 to 2011. He was earlier Bishop of Beauvais, Bishop of Noyon, Bishop of Senlis, and auxiliary bishop of Meaux. Coming from a prominent business family, he served as 'vicaire' at Notre-Dame de Passy and subsequently as 'curé' of St. Pierre de Chaillot in the 16th arrondissement of Paris. He resigned his post of archbishop on 3 June 2011.

References

External links 
Archbishop Guy Marie Alexandre Thomazeau at Catholic-Hierarchy.org
Archdiocese of Montpellier. Catholic-Hierarchy.org. Retrieved on 2008-06-19.
Metropolitan Archdiocese of Montpellier at GCatholic.org

1937 births
Living people
People from Neuilly-sur-Seine
Bishops of Beauvais
Archbishops of Montpellier
Bishops of Noyon
Bishops of Senlis
Auxiliary bishops of Meaux